The 1972–73 Durand Cup Final was the 68th final of the Durand Cup, the oldest football competition in India, and was contested between Kolkata giants East Bengal and Mohun Bagan first on 11 January 1973 and the replay on 12 January 1973 at the Corporation Stadium in New Delhi.

East Bengal won the replay final 1–0 to claim their 7th Durand Cup title. Mohammed Habib scored the only goal in the final as East Bengal lifted their seventh Durand Cup title.

Route to the final

Match

Summary
The Durand Cup final began at the Corporation Stadium in New Delhi on 11 January 1973 in front of a packed crowd as Kolkata giants East Bengal and Mohun Bagan faced each other in a Kolkata Derby. East Bengal reached their ninth Durand Cup final after defeating Simla Youngs  7–0 in the semi-final, having won the tournament six times previously in 1951, 1952, 1956, 1960, 1967, and 1970. Mohun Bagan reached their tenth Durand Cup final after they defeated Mafatlal 1–0 in the semi-final, having won the tournament six times previously in 1953, 1959, 1960, 1963, 1964, and 1965. -

East Bengal started as the favourites having a star studded lineup, being unbeaten throughout the season so far, having already won the Calcutta Football League and the IFA Shield. Mohun Bagan custodian Tarun Bose was the busiest throughout the match, making multiple saves as East Bengal failed to break the deadlock. Mohun Bagan did get a chance in the twenty-first minute when Subhash Bhowmick found himself in front of the goal but wasted the opportunity. In the second half, both the teams failed to break the deadlock as the game ended in a 0–0 stalemate. The Durand committee decided to host the replay final the very next day.

Details

Replay

Summary
The replay final began at the Corporation Stadium in New Delhi on 12 January 1973 as the first final finished in a 0–0 draw.

East Bengal once again started as the favourites and made attacks from the very first minute, however, Mohun Bagan custodian Tarun Bose was once again at the rescue as he saved multiple shots to keep the game scoreless. East Bengal eventually got the opportunity to score in the seventy-seventh minute of the match when Shankar Banerjee handled the ball inside the box while clearing a cross by Samaresh Chowdhury and East Bengal was awarded a penalty. Mohammed Habib scored from the spot as East Bengal took a 1–0 lead which they managed to hold onto until fulltime as East Bengal lifted their seventh Durand Cup title.

Details

References

External links
Durand Cup Finals

Durand Cup finals
1972–73 in Indian football
East Bengal Club matches
Football competitions in Kolkata